Sophie Podolski (8 October 1953 – 29 December 1974) was a Belgian poet and graphic artist. She published only one book during her short lifetime, Le pays où tout est permis (1972; The Country Where Everything Is Allowed), in which the poems were reproduced in her own artistic handwriting for its original 1972 edition (a censored, typeset edition followed in 1973).

Biography
Sophie Podolski studied etching at the Académie de Boitsfort and was associated with the artistic community at Montfaucon Research Center.

Podolski had schizophrenia and spent time in psychiatric clinics in Paris and Brussels. She attempted suicide in Brussels on 19 December 1974 and died 10 days later as a result. The method is not disclosed in articles about her.

Podolski left a number of unpublished poems and graphic artworks which were posthumously published by :fr:Marc Dachy.  Her work entitled Sophie Podolski Snow Queen was published as a special issue (no. 6, 1980) of the literary magazine Luna Park.

Her poetry was much admired by the novelist and poet Roberto Bolaño, who referenced Podolski in his novels The Savage Detectives, Antwerp, and Distant Star, and in his short stories "Vagabond in France and Belgium" and "Dance Card" (both collected in Last Evenings on Earth).

References

External links
 "From Le pays où tout est permis", translated into English by Paul Legault

1953 births
1974 suicides
Belgian poets in French
Belgian artists
Artists who committed suicide
Suicides in Belgium
People with schizophrenia
20th-century Belgian poets
Belgian women poets
20th-century Belgian women writers
20th-century Belgian women artists
Belgian people of Ukrainian descent